A signature dish is a recipe that identifies an individual chef or restaurant. Ideally it should be unique and allow an informed gastronome to name the chef in a blind tasting. It can be thought of as the culinary equivalent of an artist finding their own style, or an author finding their own voice. In practice a chef's signature dish often changes with time or they may claim several signature dishes.

In a weaker sense, a signature dish may become associated with an individual restaurant, particularly if the chef who created it is no longer with the establishment. It can also be used to refer to a culinary region, in which case its meaning may be the equivalent of "national dish". In many cases, restaurants will base their menu development on tastes and styles which are unique to the restaurant's geographical location. Local produce, restaurant décor, and even the type of building you choose can all contribute to a larger yield by taking on local sensibilities. Emphasizing (an establishment's) connection to its location provides great marketing possibilities.

At its weakest, the term can simply mean "chef's specials" which are in no way unique or even particularly unusual.

Examples 
 Franz Sacher - sachertorte
 Albert Roux - Soufflé Suissesse
 Gordon Ramsay - Cappuccino of white beans with grated truffles
 Heston Blumenthal - snail porridge
 Fergus Henderson - roast bone marrow with parsley salad
 Daniel Boulud - Crisp Paupiettes of Sea Bass in Barolo Sauce
 The Waldorf-Astoria Hotel, New York City - Waldorf salad
 Hotel Tatin, Lamotte-Beuvron, France - Tarte Tatin

See also

 List of restaurant terminology

References

Cuisine
Restaurant terminology